Aethes hartmanniana, the scabious conch, is a moth of the family Tortricidae. It was described by Carl Alexander Clerck in 1759. It is found in most of Europe, Asia Minor, Armenia and the southern Urals. The species occurs in chalky and limestone habitats.

Adults are on wing from June to August.

The larvae feed on Scabiosa ochroleuca, Succisa and Knautia species. They feed within the roots of their host plant. The species overwinters and pupates in the larval habitation during spring.

References

"Aethes hartmanniana (Clerck, 1759)". Insecta.pro. Retrieved January 24, 2019.

Moths described in 1759
hartmanniana
Moths of Europe
Moths of Asia
Taxa named by Carl Alexander Clerck